Kimmi Clark Lewis (March 19, 1957 – December 6, 2019) was an American politician who served as a state representative from Kim, Colorado. A Republican, Lewis represented Colorado House of Representatives District 64, a massive district which encompasses nine counties on Colorado's Eastern Plains, including Baca, Bent, Crowley, Elbert, Kiowa, Las Animas, Lincoln, Prowers, and Washington.
She was first elected in 2016. She defeated Republican incumbent Timothy Dore in the primary and went on to win the general election.

Cattle producer
Lewis was a rancher. She owned and ran the Muddy Valley Ranch near Kim, Colorado, in eastern Las Animas County. Her husband died in 2000, leaving her to operate the ranch and finish raising their six children, all of whom have since earned college degrees.

She attended Trinidad State Junior College.

Death
Lewis died of cancer on December 6, 2019, at the age of 62.

References

External links
 Legislative website
 Campaign website

21st-century American politicians
Republican Party members of the Colorado House of Representatives
People from Las Animas County, Colorado
Women state legislators in Colorado
Ranchers from Colorado
21st-century American women politicians
1957 births
2019 deaths
Deaths from cancer in Colorado